The Ndau are an ethnic Shona subethnic group which inhabits the areas in south-eastern Zimbabwe in the districts of Chipinge and Chimanimani in which they are natives. They are also found in parts of Bikita, in the Zambezi valley, in central Mozambique all the way to the coast and in central Malawi. The name "Ndau" is a derivation from the people's traditional salutation "Ndau wee!" in greetings and other social settings. When the Ngoni observed this, they called them the Ndau people, the name itself meaning the land, the place or the country in their language.  Some suggestions are that the name is derived from the Nguni words "Amading'indawo" which means "those looking for a place" as this is what the Gaza Nguni called them and the name then evolved to Ndau. This is erroneous as the natives are described in detail to have already been occupying parts of Zimbabwe and Mozambique in 1500s by Joao dos Santos. The five  largest Ndau groups are the Magova; the Mashanga; the Vatomboti, the Madanda and the Teve. Ancient Ndau People met with the Khoi/San during the first trade with the Arabs at Mapungumbwe (mapungubwe is "place of Jackals" not shiriyantonnton)and its attributed to the Kalanga people not Ndau. They traded with Arabs with “Mpalu” “Njeti” and “Vukotlo’’ these are the red, white and blue coloured cloths together with golden beads. Ndau people traded traditional herbs, spiritual powers, animal skins and bones.

The ancient Ndau people are historically  related to the Karanga tribe, and were already in Mozambique and parts of Zimbabwe by the 1500s.
Because of the large-scale conquests of the Ngunis in the 1820s a lot of the Ndau ancestry evolved to include the Nguni bloodline and ancestry. This is evident in the wealth of Nguni words in the Ndau language, Nguni names and surnames. In the 1820s, during a period of severe drought, northern Nguni armies particularly the (Zulu, Swazi, Ndwandwe, Khumalo and Ndebele) people who speak related Bantu languages and inhabit southeast Africa from Cape Province to southern Mozambique, began to migrate to Mozambique from what is now South Africa. One Nguni chief, Nxaba, established a short-lived kingdom inland from Sofala, but in 1837 he was defeated by Soshangane, a powerful Nguni rival. Eventually Soshangane established his capital in the highlands of the middle Sabie River in what is present day Zimbabwe. The Nguni-Shangaans established the Gaza-kingdom in southern Mozambique and subjugated many of the Ndau people who were already living in that area. This history shows that the Nguni invaders had slain a lot of the Ndau men and taken their wives. Due to this, a lot of the "Ndau people" have a lineage with Nguni influences. This was further cemented by the intermarriages between the Nguni and Ndau. The more appropriate term to describe the resultant group including the modern Ndau is Shangaan. The Ndau culture also evolved to include Nguni practices in the same that many Nguni words became part of the Ndau language. 

According to Earthy, when the Ndau people were conquered by the Ndwandwe-Ngunis, some of the Ndau people took refuge among the Chopi (Copi) people, who had amassed rifles from the Portuguese in order to protect themselves.  It is suggested by some that some of the Chopi people remained independent of the Nguni Gaza Empire. In forming the Gaza empire, Soshangane and his Nguni impis [armies] overran and incorporated the Tsonga, Shongonono, Ngomane, Portuguese, Hlengwe, Nyai, Rhonga, Shona, Senga, Chopi as well as the Ndau tribes in a new nation with the people collectively called Shangani.  

With the prolonged drought, the rise of Gaza, the dominance of the slave trade, and the expansion of Portuguese control in the Zambezi Valley, the once-mighty African chieftaincies of the Zambezi region declined. In their place, valley warlords established fortified strongholds at the confluence of the major rivers, where they raised private armies and raided for slaves in the interior. The most powerful of these warlords was Manuel António de Sousa, also known as Gouveia, a settler from Portuguese India, who by the middle of the 19th century controlled most of the southern Zambezi Valley and a huge swath of land to its south. North of the Zambezi, Islamic slave traders rose to power from their base in Angoche, and the Yao chiefs of the north migrated south to the highlands along the Shire River, where they established their military power.[1]
As a result of this settlement in Chipinge, some Ndau-Shangaan settled in what is now modern day Mozambique for it has to be borne in mind that prior to the arrival of the Portuguese and English in the colonization of what is now Zimbabwe and Mozambique respectively. Historically through hundreds of years of   mixing with other Shona groups, the Ndau language and customs evolved . The intermarriage with the conquering Ngunis added a Nguni flavour to the language and culture. Ancient Ndau  could be one of the most ancient form of all modern day Nguni languages. It is possible that the ancient Ndau are one of the first ancestral tribes of the Ngunis, similarly to the Mthethwas, Lala, and Debe who are descended from the Thonga-Tekelas. This is all conjecture at this point and further research would need to be carried out to establish this. 

 In a strict sense of the term the Ndau language is mainly spoken in the following southern districts of the Sofala province: Machanga, Chibabava, Machaze (Danda), Buzi and in Nhamatanda, Dondo and Beira (Bangwe) and resembles the Shona language with many Nguni words. It is also  partly spoken in Mambone (Inhambane province) and Mossurize. They also speak Portuguese in Mozambique and English in Zimbabwe. In Zimbabwe, Ndau is mainly spoken in Chipinge and Chimanimani districts.-
Along the railway line between Beira and Zimbabwe the Sena language, originally only spoken in the Zambezi valley, has become a kind of lingua franca.

Demographics
As of 1997, it was estimated that there were 581,000 speakers of Ndau in Mozambique.  There are  many Ndau-Shangani clans residing in South Africa.  The village called Mbozi, currently known as Govhu at Malamulele, is composed entirely of Shangani clans such as Sithole, Miyambo, Simango, Moyana, and Mashaba many of whom also have Ndau roots in addition to the Nguni roots from where they derive their names. The names above are Nguni with their origins in Zululand where the Ndwandwe resided before fleeing as a result of the Mfecane. 

Ndau is also one of the languages used in churches in Beira.
.
Today the Ndau-Shangaan are largely identified by these surnames, Sakwinje, Semwayo, Simango, Sibiya, Dhliwayo, Dube, Makuyana, Mlambo, Mthethwa, Mhlanga, Nxumalo Hlatshwayo, Sithole, Kwidini, Sidhile, Dhlakama, Bhila and Zharikiya. It is important to note that not all people called by these names can be identified as Ndau with the exception of Zharikiya. This is because these are Nguni names which are common among the Nguni and can be found in Zululand as well as Matebeleland from peoples who have no link with the Ndau. To understand the modern Ndau, you have to understand the Nguni influence which is very strong.

Politics
Renamo, the Mozambican National Resistance Movement, draws support from the Shangaan in the Sofala province of Mozambique (to where its leader Dhlakama belong, as well as the Catholic archbishop of Beira), in part due to their poor socio-economic conditions and their so far too weak inclusion in foreign financial investments and socio-economic developmental programs of the governing party.

The first president of ZANU in Zimbabwe prior to independence was Ndabaningi Sithole, from near Mt. Selinda. Once Robert Mugabe came to power, Sithole formed his own party, ZANU-Ndonga that continues to garner widespread support among the Ndau-Shangani community. Because of Sithole's contentious relationship with Mugabe,

Sorcery, exorcism and herbal medicine
The Ndau people are also known to be very good herbalists, they are  openly expressed by Mozambicans to be the most feared black magicians. Historical records describe the Ndau as "humble and non-violent" people and yet are known to use magic when offended or to deal with transgressors. Their spirits are also known to fiercely revenge deaths due to murders or other unjust means. The majority of Zimbabwean dwellers as a whole are known to fear anyone who threatens them with Ndau approach sorcery and witch doctor consultations of the same area. They are therefore able to fight injustices despite their small and non-violent nature using sorcery and magic. 

Limila, Gonjo, Shipandagwala, Shingomungomu and Shiriyadengha  are the Ndau-Shangani people from the Ndau Sithole Clan (there are many Sitholes who have no connection with the Ndau. Sithole is of Nguni origin in Zululand) who moved  from Zambezi Valley along Limpopo River and traded with both Arabs and Portuguese people. There are many clans from the Ndau-Shangani ethnic groups such as  Mlambo; acknowledged as father of Ndau peoples, Simango, Khumbula, Mhlanga, Ndlakama, Mashaba and Moyana (Gumbi, Phahla). 
NB: It has to be noted that the traditional Ndau identify themselves as one for they regard Musikavanthu/Mlambo as their common ancestor. Even though they identify themselves by different names and surnames such as Moyana which means sheep, they at the end of the day consider themselves to be Dziva for they are Musikavanthu's children. To this day, Musikavanthu has great respect and renown as a rainmaker and is considered the Earthly embodiment of the CREATOR of the Universe Mwari Musikavanthu or Musikavanhu as the CREATOR is commonly known amongst the Shona. There has been great effort to diminish the importance of the Musikavanthu/Mlambo chieftaincy in modern day Zimbabwe as Robert Mugabe sought to downplay the importance of this unique chieftaincy by putting forward fallacies and falsehoods that portrayed Mugabe's ancestry as having descended from the Munhumutapas. It has to be borne in mind that the Munhumutapa Empire was founded by Nyatsimba Mutota who was of the Dziva totem as he was a son of Dziva Musikavanhu who had left Great Zimbabwe after its abandonment by Musikavanhu due to transgressions that had been committed by all peoples against Musikavanthu's commands/Mhiko.

Sena people Many Ndau people have embraced the Christian religion.

References

Ethnic groups in Mozambique
Ethnic groups in Zimbabwe